Bah Mamadou (born 31 October 1979) is a retired international footballer. Born in Mali, he represented Singapore at the international level after playing most of his career in the Singapore Premier League.

Personal life
Mamadou is married to Rachael Bah.  They have 4 children.  Bah Bill Abuzar Mamadou, Bah Danish Mamadou, Bah Kaiden and Bah Carina Aminata.  Mamadou's son, Bill Mamadou, is also a professional footballer, making his debut in the Singapore Premier League in 2019.

Honors
 Étoile du Congo
 Congo Premier League: 2000
 Coupe du Congo: 2000
 Woodlands Wellington
 Singapore League Cup: 2007
 Gombak United
 Singapore League Cup: 2008
 Singapore Armed Forces
 Singapore Cup: 2012

References

Living people
1979 births
Guinean emigrants to Singapore
Naturalised citizens of Singapore
Singaporean footballers
Association football defenders
AS Real Bamako players
Étoile du Congo players
Gombak United FC players
Balestier Khalsa FC players
Home United FC players
Woodlands Wellington FC players
Warriors FC players
Malian Première Division players
Singapore Premier League players
Singapore international footballers
Singaporean expatriate footballers
Expatriate footballers in Mali
Expatriate footballers in the Republic of the Congo